Salomon Stricker (1 January 1834 – 2 April 1898) was an Austrian pathologist and histologist.

Career
Stricker was born in Waag-Neustadtl (Hungarian: Vágújhely, now Nové Mesto nad Váhom in Slovakia). He studied at the University of Vienna, and subsequently became a research assistant at the Institute of Physiology under Ernst Wilhelm von Brücke. Later he became head of the Institute of General and Experimental Pathology in Vienna.

Stricker is remembered for his extensive studies in the fields of histology and experimental pathology, and is credited with making discoveries involving the diapedesis of erythrocytes and the contractility of vascular walls. He also made contributions in his research of cell division in vivo, on the histology of the cornea, and on the relationship of cells to the extracellular matrix.

During its time, it was considered one of the greatest textbooks concerning histology. Stricker was also the author of a number of philosophical works.

In his landmark The Interpretation of Dreams, Sigmund Freud discusses a passage in Stricker's Studien über das Bewusstsein regarding the expression of affect in dreams (e.g. fear, joy) and the dream's ideational content, and how these two elements compare to the ideational/affective dynamic in an awake state. In his book, Stricker uses as an example: "If I am afraid of robbers in my dreams, the robbers, to be sure, are imaginary, but the fear of them is real". It was at Stricker's institute that ophthalmologist Karl Koller, at the suggestion of Freud, began his experimentation with cocaine as a local anaesthetic.

Stricker died in Vienna, aged 64.

Selected publications 
 Handbuch der Lehre von den Geweben des Menschen und der Thiere (Textbook on the doctrine of tissues of humans and animals), (1871–73)
 Vorlesungen über allgemeine und experimentelle Pathologie (Lectures on general and experimental pathology), (1877–83)
 Studien über das Bewusstsein (Studies on consciousness), (1879)
 Studien über die Sprachvorstellungen (Studies on language performances), (1880)
 Über die Bewegungsvorstellungen (1882)
 Studien über die Association der Vorstellungen (Studies on the association of ideas), 1883
 Physiologie des Rechts, (1884).
From 1871 to 1880, Stricker was editor of the Medicinischen Jahrbücher.

References 
 History of the Department of Pathophysiology, University of Vienna
 Stricker, Salomon, Meyers Großes Konversations-Lexikon

External links 
 Jewish Encyclopedia: “Stricker, Salomon” by Isidore Singer & Frederick Haneman, 1906.
, Volume 1; Volume 2
The Interpretation of Dreams by Sigmund Freud, the Affects in Dreams p. 226

Academic staff of the University of Vienna
University of Vienna alumni
Austrian pathologists
Austrian histologists
Hungarian pathologists
Hungarian histologists
Jewish physicians
People from Nové Mesto nad Váhom
19th-century Austrian people
19th-century Hungarian people
Austro-Hungarian Jews
1834 births
1898 deaths
Burials at Döbling Cemetery